Iva Majoli was the defending champion but lost in the quarterfinals to Steffi Graf.

Second-seeded Martina Hingis won the final on a walkover against Graf.

Seeds
A champion seed is indicated in bold text while text in italics indicates the round in which that seed was eliminated. The top four seeds received a bye to the second round.

  Steffi Graf (final)
  Martina Hingis (champion)
  Conchita Martínez (quarterfinals)
  Anke Huber (semifinals)
  Iva Majoli (quarterfinals)
  Lindsay Davenport (quarterfinals)
  Irina Spîrlea (second round)
  Brenda Schultz-McCarthy (semifinals)

Draw

Final

Section 1

Section 2

External links
 1997 Toray Pan Pacific Open Draw

Pan Pacific Open
Toray Pan Pacific Open - Singles
1997 Toray Pan Pacific Open